World Class Championship Wrestling (WCCW) based out of Dallas, Texas held a number of major professional wrestling super shows under the name Wrestling Star Wars between 1981 and 1989, with five of these being held in 1984.

Wrestling Star Wars (January)

Wrestling Star Wars (January 1984) was a professional wrestling supercard show that was held on January 30, 1984. The show was produced and scripted by the Dallas, Texas-based World Class Championship Wrestling (WCCW) professional wrestling promotion and held in their home area, Dallas/Ft. Worth, Texas. Several matches from the show were taped for WCCW's television shows and broadcast in the weeks following the show. The show was the 12th overall show in the "Wrestling Star Wars" event chronology. The show was held at the Fort Worth Convention Center, with an estimated 18,000 seat capacity when configured for professional wrestling shows.

Results

Independence Day Star Wars

Independence Day Star Wars (1984) was a professional wrestling supercard show that was held on July 4, 1984. The show was produced and scripted by the Dallas, Texas-based World Class Championship Wrestling (WCCW) professional wrestling promotion and held in their home area, Dallas/Ft. Worth, Texas. Several matches from the show were taped for WCCW's television shows and broadcast in the weeks following the show. The show was the 13th overall show in the "Wrestling Star Wars" event chronology. The event, held at the Fort Worth Convention Center, drew 12,721 spectators out if its estimated 18,000 seat capacity when configured for professional wrestling shows.

Results

Labor Day Star Wars

Labor Day Star Wars (1984) was a professional wrestling supercard show that was held on September 3, 1984. The show was produced and scripted by the Dallas, Texas-based World Class Championship Wrestling (WCCW) professional wrestling promotion and held in their home area, Dallas/Ft. Worth, Texas. Several matches from the show were taped for WCCW's television shows and broadcast in the weeks following the show. The show was the 14th overall show in the "Wrestling Star Wars" event chronology. The  show, held at the Fort Worth Convention Center, drew 10,000 spectators out if its estimated 18,000 seat capacity when configured for professional wrestling shows.

Results

Thanksgiving Star Wars

Thanksgiving Star Wars (1984) was a professional wrestling supercard show that was held on November 22, 1984. The show was produced and scripted by the Dallas, Texas-based World Class Championship Wrestling (WCCW) professional wrestling promotion and held in their home area, Dallas, Texas. Several matches from the show were taped for WCCW's television shows and broadcast in the weeks following the show. The show was the 15thoverall show in the "Wrestling Star Wars" event chronology. The show, held at the Reunion Arena, drew 15,325 spectators out of its approximately 21,000 seat capacity.

Results

Christmas Star Wars

Christmas Star Wars (1984) was a professional wrestling supercard show that was held on December 25, 1984. The show was produced and scripted by the Dallas, Texas-based World Class Championship Wrestling (WCCW) professional wrestling promotion and held in their home arna, Dallas, Texas. Several matches from the show were taped for WCCW's television shows and broadcast in the weeks following the show. The show was the 16th overall show in the "Wrestling Star Wars" event chronology. The show, held at the Reunion Arena, drew 20,000 spectators out of its approximately 21,000 seat capacity.

Results

References

1984 in professional wrestling
World Class Championship Wrestling shows